<noinclude>

Breiðablik (sometimes anglicised as Breithablik or Breidablik) is the home of Baldr in Nordic mythology.

Meaning
The word  has been variously translated as 'broad sheen', 'Broad gleam', 'Broad-gleaming' or 'the far-shining one',

Attestations

Grímismál
The Eddic poem Grímnismál describes Breiðablik as the fair home of Baldr:

Gylfaginning
In Snorri Sturluson's Gylfaginning, Breiðablik is described in a list of places in heaven, identified by some scholars as Asgard:

Later in the work, when Snorri describes Baldr, he gives another description, citing Grímnismál, though he does not name the poem:

Interpretation and discussion
The name of Breiðablik has been noted to link with Baldr's attributes of light and beauty.

Similarities have been drawn between the description of Breiðablik in Grímnismál and Heorot in Beowulf, which are both free of 'baleful runes' ( and  respectively). In Beowulf, the lack of  refers to the absence of crimes being committed, and therefore both halls have been proposed to be sanctuaries.

In popular culture

 Breidablik is a sacred weapon in Fire Emblem Heroes that the Summoner uses to summon Heroes coming from different Fire Emblem games.
 In the PlayStation game Xenogears, Bledavik is the name of the capital city of the desert kingdom of Aveh on the Ignas continent.

See also
 Álfheimr, the home of Freyr
 Nóatún, the home of Njörðr
 Þrúðvangr, the home of Thor

Citations

Bibliography

Primary

Secondary
 
 
 

Baldr
Locations in Norse mythology